"One Step Ahead" is a 1980 song by New Zealand art rock group Split Enz. It was released November 1980 as the lead single from their seventh studio album Waiata.

After Split Enz's dissolution in 1984, singer Neil Finn continued to perform "One Step Ahead" with his next group Crowded House, in particular, the group performed the song live at their 1987 concert in Daytona known as Spring Break '87.

The single's b-side "In the Wars" was recorded in the Waiata recording sessions, however was not originally released as a track on the album, though was later appended as track twelve in the album's 2006 re-release.

Music video
The video clip for the song was one of the first ever videos screened on MTV. In a documentary for Radio New Zealand, Neil Finn expressed surprise at the song's success, stating that it "hasn't got a proper chorus".

The video starts with Neil Finn walking down a blue and red staircase, and continues to walk through a hallway with different coloured walls and shadows of what seems to be other members of the band playing instruments. He then enters a room with the five members.

The video clip for "One Step Ahead" has keyboardist Eddie Rayner performing "Marche sur place", the pantomime illusion walk created by Decroux and Barrault (seen in the 1945 French film Children of Paradise) that is the technique Michael Jackson would base his moonwalk on in 1983.

Track listings
"One Step Ahead" – 2:51
"In the Wars" – 3:32

Personnel
 Neil Finn – vocals and guitar
 Tim Finn – backing vocals
 Noel Crombie – percussion
 Eddie Rayner – keyboards
 Malcolm Green – drums
 Nigel Griggs – bass guitar

Charts

Weekly charts

Year-end charts

References

External resources

Split Enz songs
1980 singles
Songs written by Neil Finn
Mushroom Records singles
1980 songs